Joseph Wharton Lippincott (February 28, 1887 – October 22, 1976) was a noted publisher, author, naturalist, and sportsman. He was the grandson of Joshua Ballinger Lippincott, founder of Philadelphia publisher J.B. Lippincott Company, and of industrialist Joseph Wharton, founder of the Wharton School of Business of the University of Pennsylvania.

Biography
Lippincott was born in Philadelphia, Pennsylvania, the son of J. Bertram Lippincott, one of the three children of Joshua Bertram Lippincott, and Joanna Wharton Lippincott, one of the three daughters of Joseph Wharton. He was educated at the Episcopal Academy and the Wharton School, from which he graduated in 1908. Following college, he joined J. B. Lippincott & Co., the family publishing firm he would serve for fifty years, including as president from 1927 until 1948, and then as chairman of the board until his retirement in 1958.

Books
Lippincott wrote seventeen books about animals and nature, including Wilderness Champion; The Wolf King; The Wahoo Bobcat; Long Horn, Leader of the Deer; Chiseltooth, the Beaver; Persimmon Jim, the Possum; Bun, a Wild Rabbit; Little Red, the Fox; Gray Squirrel; Striped Coat, the Skunk; The Red Roan Pony; Animal Neighbors of the Countryside; and Black Wings, the Unbeatable Crow.

Award for Outstanding Librarianship
In 1938 he founded the Joseph W. Lippincott Award for Outstanding Librarianship, which continues to be awarded by the American Library Association each year. Recipients of the Award have included Mary Utopia Rothrock, Essae Martha Culver, Carleton B. Joeckel, Lester Asheim, Robert Wedgeworth, Peggy Sullivan, John N. Berry, John Y. Cole, and Carla Hayden.

Family
He married Elizabeth Schuyler Mills in 1913, and the couple had two sons, Joseph Wharton Lippincott, Jr. and R. Schuyler Lippincott, and a daughter, Elizabeth (Betsy) Schuyler (Lippincott) Wilkes. His wife died in 1943 and he remarried Virginia (Jones) Mathieson in 1945.

Bibliography

Fiction
Bun: a Wild Rabbit (1918)
Red Ben the Fox of Oak Ridge (1919)
Gray Squirrel (1921)
Striped Coat, the Skunk (1922) illustrated with photographs
Persimmon Jim the 'Possum (1924)
Long Horn, Leader of the Deer (1928) illustrated with photographs
The Wolf King (1933) illustrated by Paul Bransom
The Red Roan Pony (1934) illustrated by Lynn Bogue Hunt
Chisel-Tooth the Beaver (1936) illustrated by Roland V. Shutts
Wilderness Champion (1944) illustrated by Paul Bransom
Black Wings: The Unbeatable Crow (1947) illustrated by Lynn Bogue Hunt
The Wahoo Bobcat (1950) illustrated by Paul Bransom
The Phantom Deer (1954) illustrated by Paul Bransom
Old Bill, the Whooping Crane (1958) illustrated with photographs
Coyote, the Wonder Wolf (1964) illustrated by Ed Dodd

American Wildlife Series
All the books in this series of revised reissues were illustrated by George F. Mason. The original editions, published between 1918 and 1928, had been illustrated with photographs.
Bun, a Wild Rabbit (revised edition, 1953)
Little Red the Fox (revised edition of Red Ben, the Fox of Oak Ridge, 1953)
Gray Squirrel (revised edition, 1954)
Striped Coat, the Skunk (revised edition, 1954)
Persimmon Jim, the Possum (revised edition, 1955)
Long Horn, Leader of the Deer (revised edition, 1955)

Non-Fiction
Naturecraft Creatures: The Art of Woodland and Sea Beach Modelling (1933, with G.J. Roberts)
Animal Neighbors of the Countryside (1938) illustrated by Lynn Bogue Hunt

References

External links 
 
 

1887 births
1976 deaths
American publishers (people)